Vesicocoelium is a genus of trematodes in the family Opecoelidae.

Species
Vesicocoelium marinum (Karyakarte & Yadav, 1976) Cribb, 2005
Vesicocoelium solenophagum Tang, Hsu, Huang & Lu, 1975

References

Opecoelidae
Plagiorchiida genera